Bromine water is an oxidizing, intense brown mixture containing diatomic bromine (Br2) dissolved in water (H2O).  It is often used as a reactive in chemical assays of recognition for substances which react with bromine in an aqueous environment with the halogenation mechanism, mainly unsaturated carbon compounds (carbon compounds with 1 or more double or triple bond(s)). The most common compounds that react well with bromine water are phenols, alkenes, enols, the acetyl group, aniline, and glucose. In addition, bromine water is commonly used to test for the presence of an alkene which contains a double covalent bond, reacting with the bromine water, changing its color from an intense yellow to a colorless solution. Bromine water is also commonly used to check for the presence of an aldehyde group in compounds. In this reaction, the color of bromine water is changed to yellow from colorless (oxidation process).

See also
 Bromine test

References

External links

Bromine
Chemical tests
Oxidizing mixtures
Water